The Tango Player is a 1991 German drama film directed by Roland Gräf. It was entered into the 41st Berlin International Film Festival.

Cast
 Michael Gwisdek as Hans-Peter Dallow
 Corinna Harfouch as Elke
 Hermann Beyer as Dr. Berger
 Peter Prager as Roessler
 Peter Sodann as Schulze
 Reiner Heise as Müller
 Jaecki Schwarz as Harry

References

External links

1991 films
1991 drama films
German drama films
1990s German-language films
Films directed by Roland Gräf
Films set in 1968
1990s German films